Leucactinia is a genus of flowering plants in the tribe Tageteae within the family Asteraceae.

Species
There is only one known species, Leucactinia bracteata, native to the State of Coahuila in northern Mexico.

References

Tageteae
Endemic flora of Mexico
Monotypic Asteraceae genera